Frederick Andermann  (September 26, 1930 – June 16, 2019) was a Canadian neurologist and epileptologist.

Biography

He was born and initially raised in Chernivtsi, belonging at that time to Romania, today Ukraine. When this area was annexed by the Soviet Union in 1940, his family first moved to Bucharest, then to Switzerland and France (Paris), before they immigrated to Canada in 1950, where he trained in medicine at the Université de Montréal and then neurology at the Montreal Neurological Institute and Hospital.

He was a professor at the Departments of Neurology and Neurosurgery and Pediatrics at McGill University in Montreal and was the director of the Epilepsy Unit and Clinic of the Montreal Neurological Institute and Hospital for many years. He was a founding member, president, and past president of the Canadian League Against Epilepsy, president of the Canadian Neurological Society, the Canadian Society for Clinical Neurophysiology, the Canadian Association of Child Neurologists and the Canadian Eastern EEG Society. In the International League Against Epilepsy, he was a chairman of the Task Force on Classification and of the Commission on Classification and Terminology from 1993 to 1997, first vice president from 2001 to 2005, and second vice president from 2005 to 2009.

His contributions to the field of epilepsy research are many. In 1972, and 1986 he described Andermann syndrome named after him together with his wife Eva (also a neurologist and epileptologist) and others.

Awards

Andermann was the recipient of numerous awards in the course of his career for his dedication to epilepsy research and treatment.

Books
Andermann F, Lugaresi E, eds. Migraine and Epilepsy. Boston – London – Durban, et al, Butterworth 1987
Andermann F, Rasmussen T, eds. Chronic Encephalitis and Epilepsy. Rasmussen’s Syndrome. Boston – London – Oxford, Butterworth-Heinemann 1991
Andermann F, Rasmussen T, eds. Chronic Encephalitis and Epilepsy. Rasmussen’s Syndrome"". Boston – London – Oxford, Butterworth-Heinemann 1991
Andermann F, Beaumanoir A, Mira L, et al, eds. Occipital Seizures and Epilepsies in Children. Colloquium of the Pierfranco e Luisa Mariano Foundation. Mariana Foundation Pediatric Neurology Series: 1. London – Paris – Rome, J. Libbey 1993
Shorvon SD, Fish DR, Andermann F, Bydder GM, Stefan H, eds. Magnetic Resonance Scanning and Epilepsy. Proceedings of a NATO Advanced Research Workshop on Advanced Magnetic Resonance and Epilepsy, held October 1-3, 1992, in Chalfont St. Peter, Buckinghamshire, United Kingdom (NATO ASI Series; Series A: Life Sciences, Vol 264). New York – London, Plenum Press (New York, Springer Science + Business Media) 1994
Andermann F, Aicardi J, Vigevano F, eds. Alternating Hemiplegia of Childhood (International Review of Child Neurology Series). New York, Raven Press, 1994
Guerrini R, Andermann F, Canapicchi R, et al, eds. "Dysplasias of Cerebral Cortex and Epilepsy". Philadelphia – New York, Lippincott – Raven 1996
Beaumanoir A, Andermann F, Avanzini G, Mira L, eds. Falls in Epileptic and Non-epileptic Seizures During Childhood (Mariani Foundation Paediatric Neurology: 6). London – Paris – Rome – Sydney, J. Libbey 1997
Gobbi G, Andermann F, Naccarato S, Banchini G, eds. Epilepsy and other Neurological Disorders in Coeliac Disease. London – Paris – Rome – Sydney, J. Libbey 1997
Zifkin BG, Andermann F, Beaumanoir A, Rowan AJ, eds. Reflex Epilepsies and Reflex Seizures (Advances in Neurology, Vol 75). Philadelphia – New York Lippincott – Raven 1998
Stefan H, Andermann F, Chauvel P, Shorvon SD, eds. "Plasticity in Epilepsy: Dynamic Aspects of Brain Function" (Advances in Neurology, Vol 81). Philadelphia – Baltimore – New York, et al, Lippincott Williams & Wilkins 1999
Spreafico R, Avanzini G, Andermann F, eds. Abnormal Cortical Development and Epilepsy. From Basic to Clinical Science (Mariani Foundation Paediatric Neurology: 7). London, J. Libbey, 1999
Guerrini R, Aicardi J, Andermann F, Hallett M, eds. Epilepsy and Movement Disorders. Cambridge – New York – Port Melbourne, et al, Cambridge University Press 2002
Beaumanoir A, Andermann F, Chauvel P, et al, eds. Frontal Lobe Seizures and Epilepsies in Children (Mariani Foundation Paediatric Neurology: 11). Montrouge, J. Libbey Eurotext 2003
Hirsch E, Andermann F, Chauvel P, et al, eds. Generalized Seizures: From Clinical Phenomenology to underlying Systems and Networks'' (Progress in Epileptic Disorders, Vol 2). Montrouge – Esher, J. Libbey Eurotext 2006
Shorvon SD, Andermann F, Guerrini R, eds. "The Causes of Epilepsy. Common and Uncommon Causes in Adults and Children". Cambridge – New York – Melbourne, et al, Cambridge University Press 2011

References

External links
 Prix Wilder-Penfield citation 

1930 births
2019 deaths
Canadian medical researchers
Academic staff of McGill University
Officers of the Order of Canada
Ukrainian emigrants to Canada
Canadian epileptologists
Jewish Canadian scientists
Canadian people of Ukrainian-Jewish descent
Université de Montréal alumni